Riznice Sjecanja is an unplugged album by Bosnian pop band Crvena Jabuka. This album was released in 1999. It includes many of the band's best hit singles in unplugged format and was recorded on 13 March and 14 March of that same year in Zagreb's OTV auditorium.

Track listing
Bjezi Kiso s Prozora
Bivse Djevojcice Bivsi Djecaci
To mi Radi
Carolija
Da Znas da me Bolis
Da Nije Ljubavi
Kad ces mi Doc?
Ti Znas
Svijet je Lopta Sarena
Malo cemo da se Kupamo
Moj Grad*
Oci su se Navikle na Mrak
Tebi je do mene Stalo
Dirlija
Ne Govori Vise
Zovu Nas Ulice
Svidja mi se ova stvar
Ima Nesto od Srca do Srca
Riznice Sjecanja

Note
 denotes previously unreleased material.

Personnel

Crvena Jabuka
Dražen Žerić - melodica, vocals
Zlatko Bebek -  guitar
Kresmir Krestenac  -bass guitar
Danijel Lastric  - keyboards and background vocals
Darko Jelcic - drums, percussion
Nikša Bratoš -  guitar, background vocals, flute, and zither

Additional musicians
Darija Hodnik - background vocals
Mirza Tretac - background vocals
Jana Nemecek -  background vocals
Klapa Nastalgia  - background vocals
Emir Pagric - violin, mandolin

Crvena jabuka albums
1999 live albums